DNA-directed RNA polymerase II subunit RPB3 is an enzyme that in humans is encoded by the POLR2C gene.

Function 

This gene encodes the third largest subunit of RNA polymerase II, the polymerase responsible for synthesizing messenger RNA in eukaryotes. The product of this gene contains a cysteine rich region and exists as a heterodimer with another polymerase subunit, POLR2J. These two subunits form a core subassembly unit of the polymerase. A pseudogene has been identified on chromosome 21.

Interactions 
POLR2C has been shown to interact with:

 ATF4, 
 CCHCR1, 
 Myogenin,
 POLR2A, 
 POLR2B, 
 POLR2E and 
 POLR2F, 
 POLR2G, 
 POLR2H, 
 POLR2J, 
 POLR2K, 
 POLR2L,  and
 TAF15.

References

Further reading